Frankenweenie is a 2012 American 3D stop-motion animated science fiction horror comedy film directed by Tim Burton, written by John August, and starring Catherine O'Hara, Martin Short, Martin Landau, Charlie Tahan, Atticus Shaffer, and Winona Ryder. Produced by Walt Disney Pictures, it is a feature-length remake of Burton's 1984 short film of the same name, and is also both a parody of and homage to the 1931 film Frankenstein, based on Mary Shelley's 1818 book Frankenstein; or, The Modern Prometheus. In the film, a boy named Victor Frankenstein uses the power of electricity to resurrect his dead Bull Terrier, Sparky, but his peers discover what he has done and reanimate their own deceased pets and other creatures, resulting in mayhem. 

Frankenweenie came development in December 2007, when Burton was asked to direct two 3D films for Disney, including a live-action adaptation of Alice in Wonderland. However, the development of a full-length stop motion dates as far back as November 2005, when scripts had been written by Josann McGibbon and Sara Parriott. Filming for a stop-motion feature film began at 3 Mills Studios in July 2010. The tongue-in-cheek film contains numerous references to and parodies of elements of Frankenstein and past film versions of it, other literary classics, various horror and science-fiction films, and other films which Burton has directed or produced.

Frankenweenie, which was both the first black-and-white feature-length film and the first stop-motion film to be released in IMAX 3D, premiered at Fantastic Fest on September 20, 2012 and was released in the United States on October 5, to generally positive reviews for its visuals and story and moderate box office returns. Grossing $81.5 million worldwide against a $39 million budget, it won the Saturn Award for Best Animated Film, and was nominated for an Academy Award, a Golden Globe, a BAFTA, and an Annie Award for Best Animated Film, losing the first three to Brave, and the last one to Wreck-It Ralph.

Plot
Victor Frankenstein, a young scientist and amateur filmmaker, lives with his parents and his beloved bull terrier dog, Sparky, in the quiet town of New Holland. His intelligence is recognized by his classmates at school, who include his somber next-door neighbor Elsa Van Helsing who is the niece of Mayor Burgermeister, the mischievous Edgar "E" Gore, the obese and gullible Bob, the overconfident Toshiaki, the creepy Nassor, and an eccentric girl nicknamed "Weird Girl", but he does not interact much with them due to his relationship with his dog. Concerned with his son's isolation, Victor's father encourages the boy to take up baseball. When Victor hits a home run at his first game, Sparky chases the ball and is struck and killed by a car, leaving Victor despondent.

Inspired by his new science teacher Mr. Rzykruski's demonstration of the effect of electricity on dead frogs, Victor digs up Sparky, brings the dog to a makeshift laboratory in his attic, and successfully reanimates his old friend with a bolt of lightning. While Victor is at school the next day, Sparky escapes from the attic to chase Weird Girl's cat, Mr. Whiskers, and subsequently explores the neighborhood. He is recognized by Edgar, who blackmails Victor into teaching him how to raise the dead. Together, the two resurrect a dead goldfish, which turns invisible due to an error with the experiment. Edgar brags about the fish to his classmates, but when he tries to show it to a skeptical Nassor, it is gone, leading him to speculate that the revived creatures only last for a short time.

Fearful of losing the upcoming science fair, Toshiaki and Bob make a rocket out of soda bottles, and Bob breaks his arm when they test it. Mr. Rzykruski is blamed for the accident and fired by Mayor Burgermeister and the adults, who are confused by and jealous of his intelligence. The gym teacher replaces him. Before Mr. Rzykruski leaves the school, he is able to talk with Victor and advise the boy to use science wisely. Edgar accidentally reveals to Toshiaki, Nassor, and Bob that he and Victor had brought the invisible fish back from the dead, and that Victor had done the same with Sparky, which inspires them to try reanimation themselves.

Victor's parents discover Sparky in the attic and are frightened, causing the dog to flee. His father starts to talk to him about the seriousness of what he has done, but Victor tearfully tells them that he just wanted his dog back, so his parents decide to help him find Sparky and continue the conversation later.

When the family leaves, Victor's classmates invade the lab and discover the reanimation instructions. They perform their experiments separately, but each of their dead animals is turned into a monster: Mr. Whiskers holds a dead bat while he is electrocuted, resulting in both animals being fused into a grotesque vampiric feline; the dead rat Edgar found in the garbage turns into a wererat; Nassor's mummified hamster Colossus comes back to life; Toshiaki's turtle Shelley is covered in Miracle Gro and becomes a huge Gamera-like monster; and Bob's Sea-Monkeys grow into Gremlin-like amphibious humanoids. The monsters converge on the town fair, where they wreak havoc.

After Victor finds Sparky at the town's pet cemetery, Bob and Toshiaki find him and ask for his help dealing with the monsters. They go to the fair, where the Sea-Monkeys explode after eating salted popcorn, Colossus is stepped on by Shelley, and the wererat and Shelley both return to their original, deceased forms after getting electrocuted. During the chaos, Persephone, Elsa's pet poodle, is grabbed by Mr. Whiskers and carried to the town windmill, with Elsa and Victor giving pursuit. The townsfolk blame Sparky for Elsa's disappearance and chase him to the windmill, which Elsa's uncle accidentally ignites with his torch. Victor and Sparky enter the burning windmill and rescue Elsa and Persephone, but Victor is trapped inside. Sparky rescues Victor, only to be dragged back inside by Mr. Whiskers, who is fatally impaled by a flaming piece of wood just before the windmill collapses, killing Sparky again.

To reward him for his bravery, the townsfolk gather and revive Sparky with their car batteries. Persephone runs to Sparky and they touch noses, producing a spark.

Voice cast

 Catherine O'Hara as:
 Susan Frankenstein, Victor's mother.
 Weird Girl, Victor's unnamed eccentric classmate who is obsessed with the psychic predictions of her cat Mr. Whiskers.
 The Gym Teacher who replaces Mr. Rzykruski as science teacher when he gets fired and has no knowledge of science.
 Martin Short as:
 Edward Frankenstein, Victor's father.
 Mr. Burgermeister, the grumpy Mayor of New Holland who is the Frankenstein family's next-door neighbor and Elsa's uncle. Burgermeister is an homage to the villainous Burgermeister Meisterburger from the 1970 Rankin/Bass television special Santa Claus Is Comin' to Town.
 Nassor, Victor's classmate who was the owner of Colossus the hamster. Nassor has a flat head inspired by Frankenstein's monster and his voice and face resemble that of Boris Karloff, who played Frankenstein in the 1931 Frankenstein film.
 Martin Landau as Mr. Rzykruski, the eccentric, but wise, science teacher at Victor's school who has a thick Eastern European accent. His teachings inspire Victor's effort to resurrect Sparky and he acts as a mentor to Victor. Rzykruski was inspired by Burton's childhood icon Vincent Price.
 Charlie Tahan as Victor Frankenstein, a young scientist who brings his dog (and best friend), Sparky, back to life.
 Atticus Shaffer as Edgar "E" Gore, Victor's hunch-backed classmate who is the first to discover Victor brought Sparky back to life. Edgar was inspired by the Igor stock character.
 Winona Ryder as Elsa Van Helsing, Victor's kind classmate and next-door neighbor, Burgermeister's niece, and Persephone's owner.
 Robert Capron as Bob, Victor's obese classmate and Toshiaki's science fair partner.
 James Hiroyuki Liao as Toshiaki, Victor's most competitive classmate, Bob's science fair partner, and the former owner of Shelly the turtle.
 Conchata Ferrell as Bob's Mom, an obese and stereotypical suburban housewife who dotes upon her son. She believes in the status quo and that her misguided actions are in Bob's best interest.
 Tom Kenny as the New Holland Towns Folk, the ones that speak are the fire chief, a soldier, and a man in the crowd during Mayor Burgermeister's town meeting revolving around Mr. Rzykrusi's teachings.

Actor Christopher Lee, who had worked with Tim Burton on five earlier films, makes an appearance via the inclusion of a live-action clip from his 1958 film Dracula.

Production

Development
Although Tim Burton signed with Walt Disney Pictures to direct two films in Disney Digital 3-D (Alice in Wonderland and this film), development of a full-length stop motion Frankenweenie dates as far back as November 2005, when scripts had been written by Josann McGibbon and Sara Parriott. John August was approached to do a rewrite in 2006, but was not hired until January 2009.

Like the original short film, this feature version was shot in black and white. Many of the animation artists and crew from Corpse Bride were involved in the production of the film. Burton borrowed heavily from his design for the titular character of Family Dog for Sparky.

Filming
Filming began at 3 Mills Studios in July 2010. The crew created three giant sound stages, including Victor's cluttered family attic, a cemetery exterior, and a school interior. The sound stages were then divided into 30 separate areas to deal with the handcrafted, frame-by-frame style of filmmaking. Compared to other stop-motion animation sets, Frankenweenies set was much larger.

As IGN noted, the main character Sparky had to be "'dog-size' compared to the other human characters, but also large enough to house all the elements of the mechanical skeleton secreted within his various foam and silicon-based incarnation". The mechanics were small and delicate, and in some instances the filmmakers had to have Swiss watchmakers create the tiny nuts and bolts. Around 200 separate puppets were used in the film, with roughly 18 different versions of Victor. The puppets had human hair, with 40–45 joints for the human characters and about 300 parts for Sparky.

Music and soundtrack

In early 2011, it was announced that Danny Elfman would score Frankenweenie, with work already started on pre-production music.

Prior to the film's release, both an "inspired by" soundtrack album, Frankenweenie: Unleashed!, and Elfman's Frankenweenie: The Original Motion Picture Soundtrack were released by Walt Disney Records on September 25, 2012. The download of Frankenweenie: Unleashed! contained bonus content, including a custom icon and an app that loaded a menu to view more bonus content, provide input, or buy more music from Disney Music Group.

Release

Marketing
In the lead up to the film's release in October 2012, there was a traveling art exhibition detailing the work that went into creating the film. During the exhibition, it was possible to see sets and characters that were used for this stop motion feature film.

From September 14 to November 5, 2012, Disney California Adventure offered exclusive scenes from the film during nighttime operating hours of Muppet*Vision 3D.

At Disneyland, Sparky's tombstone was added to the pet cemetery outside of Haunted Mansion Holiday, a seasonal attraction that features characters from Burton's The Nightmare Before Christmas.

Premiere and theatrical release
The film premiered on September 20, 2012, on the opening night of Fantastic Fest, an annual film festival in Austin, Texas. It also opened the London Film Festival, on October 10, 2012.

Initially set for theatrical release in November 2011, Walt Disney Studios Motion Pictures moved the film twice, first to March 9, 2012, and then, in January 2011, to October 5, 2012, with John Carter taking the March 9 release date.

Box office
Frankenweenie grossed $35,291,068 in North America and $46,200,000 in other countries for a worldwide total of $81,491,068. In North America, it earned $11,412,213 its opening weekend, finishing fifth at the box office (behind Taken 2, Hotel Transylvania, Pitch Perfect, and Looper). Its second weekend, the film dropped to seventh place, grossing an additional $7,054,334. Its third weekend, it dropped to ninth place, grossing $4,329,358, and its fourth weekend, it dropped to twelfth place, grossing $2,456,350.

Home media
The film was released by Walt Disney Studios Home Entertainment on DVD, Blu-ray, and Blu-ray 3D on January 15, 2013. The Blu-ray releases included the original live-action Frankenweenie short and a new two-minute animated short, titled Captain Sparky vs the Flying Saucers, as bonus features.

Reception

Critical response
The film received generally positive reviews from critics. On Metacritic, which assigns a weighted average score out of 100 to reviews from mainstream critics, it has a score of 74, based on 38 reviews. Audiences polled by CinemaScore gave the film an average grade of "B+" on an A+ to F scale.

Justin Chang of Variety reacted positively to the film, saying that it "evinces a level of discipline and artistic coherence missing from the director's recent live-action efforts". Todd McCarthy of The Hollywood Reporter gave it a mediocre review, explaining that, while the various creative elements "pay homage to a beloved old filmmaking style", the film mostly feels "like second-generation photocopies of things Burton has done before". Roger Ebert gave the film three out of four stars, writing that it is "not one of Burton's best, but it has zealous energy" and "the charm of a boy and his dog retains its appeal". Chris Packham of The Village Voice gave the film a positive review, saying: "Frankenweenie, scripted by John August, and based on a screenplay by Lenny Ripps from Burton's original story, is tight and brief, hitting all the marks you'd expect from an animated kid's film, and enlivened by Burton's visual style. The man should make more small movies like this one." Christy Lemire of the Associated Press gave the film three out of four stars, saying: "Revisiting the past - his own, and that of the masters who came before him - seems to have brought this filmmaker's boyish enthusiasm back to life, as well." Kerry Lengel of The Arizona Republic gave the film three out of five stars, saying: "It's all perfectly entertaining, but never really reaches the heights of hilarity, perhaps because everything about the plot is underdeveloped." Lisa Schwarzbaum of Entertainment Weekly gave the film an A−, saying: "The resulting homage to Frankenstein in particular and horror movies in general is exquisite, macabre mayhem and a kind of reanimation all its own."

Michael Phillips of the Chicago Tribune gave the film two and a half stars out of four, saying: "The monster-movie component of Frankenweenie stomps all over the appeal of the original 30-minute version." Linda Barnard of the Toronto Star gave the film three out of four stars, saying: "High-concept and stylish, Frankenweenie is a playlist of films and characters from Burton's movie-loving childhood." James Berardinelli of ReelViews gave the film three out of four stars, saying: "Even as the narrative becomes progressively more ghoulish and a Godzilla wannabe shows up, Frankenweenie never loses its heart." Joe Williams of the St. Louis Post-Dispatch gave the film three out of four stars, saying: "Some audiences might feel that Frankenweenie is creaky, but those on the same wavelength as Burton will gratefully declare it's alive." Alonso Duralde of The Wrap gave the film a positive review, saying: "Fans of Tim Burton 1.0, rejoice: Frankenweenie hearkens back to the director's salad days and, in turn, to the old-school horror classics that inspired him in the first place." Claudia Puig of USA Today gave the film three and a half stars out of five, saying: "Frankenweenie is enlivened with beguiling visuals and captivating action sequences. The science is murky at best, but the underlying themes are profound, and the story is equal parts funny and poignant. It's Burton's most moving film." Rafer Guzmán of Newsday gave the film two and a half stars out of four, saying: "It's a quintessential Burton film, but also more Disney than a lot of Disney films." Amy Biancolli of the San Francisco Chronicle gave the film four out of four stars, saying: "The overall effect is great cinema, good fun, a visual feast for pie-eyed Burton fans - and a terrifically warped reminder of just how freaky a PG film can be."

Elizabeth Weitzman of the New York Daily News gave the film four out of five stars, saying: "Burton's extraordinary powers of imagination are in dazzling bloom, from the gorgeous stop-motion animation to the goofy, homemade horror movies the children direct." Peter Travers of Rolling Stone gave the film three and a half stars out of four, saying: "Only Tim Burton could envision this Frankenstein-inspired tale, and it's a honey, a dark and dazzling spellbinder that scares up laughs and surprising emotion." Colin Covert of the Star Tribune gave the film four out of four stars, saying: "The story brims with self-parody, social satire, horror, nostalgia, wit and emotional insight, with Burton keeping all the plates spinning." David Hiltbrand of The Philadelphia Inquirer gave the film two out of four stars, saying: "Frankenweenie is the apotheosis of goth director Tim Burton's oeuvre: artistic yet sterile, incredibly meticulous and totally misbegotten." Stephanie Zacharek of NPR gave the film a negative review, saying: "Burton half succeeds in making this revamped Frankenweenie its own distinctive creature, pieced together from the essential bits of the 29-minute original. But he just doesn't know when to stop, and his overgrown creation gets the better of him." Betsy Sharkey of the Los Angeles Times gave the film three out of five stars, saying: "There are so many horror auteurs Burton wants to thank that the film is absolutely bursting at the seams with knowing nods." A. O. Scott of The New York Times gave the film three out of five stars, saying: "While Frankenweenie is fun, it is not nearly strange or original enough to join the undead, monstrous ranks of the classics it adores."

Ty Burr of The Boston Globe gave the film four out of four stars, saying: "Frankenweenie is a mere 87 minutes long, which turns out to be just the right length; there's not enough time for Burton to go off the rails as he does in so many of his films." Tom Long of The Detroit News gave the film a B+, saying: "Frankenweenie may just be a wacky horror cartoon, but it's an awfully good wacky horror cartoon. Frighteningly good, you might say." Lou Lumenick of the New York Post gave the film three and a half stars out of four, saying: "Frankenweenie is still the most Tim Burton-y of the director's films, and not just because it contains a vast catalog of references to his own movies - everything from Edward Scissorhands to the underrated 1989 Batman." Richard Corliss of Time gave the film a positive review, saying: "This 3-D, black-and-white 'family' comedy is the year's most inventive, endearing animated feature." Stephen Whitty of the Newark Star-Ledger gave the film four out of four stars, saying: "The stop-motion animation - a favorite tool of Burton's - is given loving attention, and the character design is full of terrific touches, such as the hulking flat-topped schoolmate who looks a bit like a certain man-made monster." Michael O'Sullivan of The Washington Post gave the film three out of four stars, saying: "Designed to appeal to both discriminating adults and older kids, the gorgeous, black-and-white stop-motion film is a fresh, clever and affectionate love letter to classic horror movies." Moira Macdonald of The Seattle Times gave the film three out of four stars, saying: "Older kids, horror-movie buffs and Burton fans will likely enjoy this oddly gentle tale of a boy and his dog."

Awards and nominations

See also

 List of films featuring Frankenstein's monster
 List of black-and-white films produced since 1970

References

External links

 
 
 
 
 
 
 
 

2012 films
2012 3D films
2012 animated films
2010s monster movies
2012 comedy horror films
2010s supernatural horror films
2010s stop-motion animated films
2010s American animated films
American 3D films
American monster movies
American black-and-white films
American supernatural horror films
American animated horror films
American science fiction horror films
American comedy horror films
American children's animated science fiction films
Supernatural comedy films
Animated films directed by Tim Burton
Films directed by Tim Burton
Films produced by Allison Abbate
Films with screenplays by John August
Films scored by Danny Elfman
Disney film remakes
Features based on short films
Animated films about animals
Animated films about dogs
Films based on adaptations
Films about pets
Films set in the 1960s
Giant monster films
Frankenstein films
3D animated films
Resurrection in film
IMAX films
Walt Disney Pictures animated films
Animated films about rats
Films about science
Horror film remakes
2010s English-language films